Euphemius or Euphemios can refer to:

 Euphemius of Constantinople (died 515), Patriarch of Constantinople in 489–495
 Euphemius (Sicily), Byzantine commander and rebel who helped bring about the Muslim conquest of the island

See also

 Euphemia (disambiguation)